KLPS-LP was a low-power television station in the Coachella Valley, California (or the Palm Springs-Indio Nielsen ratings television market), broadcasting locally over-the-air in analog on UHF channel 19. The station has been silent since April 17, 2008, since being acquired by SMG Media Group, as the new owners needed to relocate the transmitter and main studio. The Special Temporary Authorization (STA) from the FCC was valid until October 17, 2008.

History
The station began as K19DH with an original construction permit granted to Communications Programming Agency, Inc., on March 4, 1997, but shortly thereafter, was sold to Desert Broadcasting, Inc., who completed construction and brought the station on air in late 1998. It was licensed by the FCC on January 25, 1999. Desert Broadcasting was sold to Methuselah Media, Inc., on April 16, 1999, then to a group headed by Fred Donaldson on May 1, 2001, and was renamed Desert Springs, Inc., in 2005. The station was a FamilyNet affiliate and its main studio facilities were located at a church.  On March 31, 2008, SMG Media Group acquired the station and changed its call sign to KLPS-LP.  Shortly thereafter, the new owners took the station silent so that they could relocate the main studio and transmitter. The station was run and operated digitally online (IPTV) by PNN Media Group out of Palm Springs, California. In January 2019, Pharmative, LLC purchased PNN Media group. Pharmative, LLC provides healthcare education and information on a social media platform. Dr. James Partyka, Oncology Research Scientist and Clinical Pharmacist is the owner of Pharmative, LLC along with co-owner Jimmy Mann located in Palm Springs, California.

KLPS-LP's license was cancelled by the FCC on March 19, 2015, for failure to file a license renewal application. However, since 2008, KLPS-19 currently operates as an IP Streaming Radio / TV Station owned by PHARMATIVE PNN Media Group located in Palm Springs, California.

References

External links
 

Religious television stations in the United States
LPS-LP
Television channels and stations established in 1997
Defunct television stations in the United States
Television channels and stations disestablished in 2015
1997 establishments in California
2015 disestablishments in California
LPS-LP